The following low-power television stations broadcast on digital or analog channel 28 in the United States:

 K17HT-D in Hanksville, Utah
 K28AD-D in Montrose, Colorado
 K28CQ-D in Hood River, Oregon
 K28CS-D in Pahrump, Nevada
 K28CW-D in Flagstaff, Arizona
 K28CY-D in Lewiston, California
 K28DB-D in Fall River Mills, California
 K28DD-D in Bemidji, Minnesota
 K28DJ-D in Broken Bow, Oklahoma
 K28EA-D in Washington, Utah
 K28EB-D in Cortez, etc., Colorado
 K28ER-D in Dulce & Lumberton, New Mexico
 K28EU-D in Laughlin, etc., Nevada
 K28FP-D in Astoria, Oregon
 K28FT-D in Milton-Freewater, Oregon
 K28FW-D in Peetz, Colorado
 K28GC-D in Gothenburg, Nebraska
 K28GD-D in Heppner, etc., Oregon
 K28GE-D in Woodland Park, Colorado
 K28GF-D in Cimarron, New Mexico
 K28GG-D in Medford, Oregon
 K28GI-D in Guymon, Oklahoma
 K28GJ-D in Hatch, New Mexico
 K28GM-D in Rural Garfield County, Utah
 K28GT-D in Crownpoint, New Mexico
 K28GV-D in Tres Piedras, New Mexico
 K28GX-D in Walker Lake, Nevada
 K28GY-D in Santa Barbara, etc., California
 K28HA-D in Grand Valley, Colorado
 K28HI-D in Breckenridge/Dillon, Colorado
 K28HL-D in Riverton, Wyoming
 K28HS-D in Agana, Guam
 K28IF-D in Willmar, Minnesota
 K28IH-D in Rainier, Oregon
 K28IT-D in Kanab, Utah
 K28IX-D in Pleasant Valley, Colorado
 K28IZ-D in Ely, Nevada
 K28JC-D in Enterprise, Oregon
 K28JD-D in Fort Madison, Iowa
 K28JH-D in Yuma, Colorado
 K28JK-D in Huntsville/Liberty, Utah
 K28JL-D in Morgan, etc., Utah
 K28JM-D in Waimea, Hawaii
 K28JN-D in Manti, etc., Utah
 K28JR-D in Wanship, Utah
 K28JS-D in Samak, Utah
 K28JU-D in Rock Springs, etc., Wyoming
 K28JV-D in Hilo, Hawaii
 K28JX-D in Alva - Cherokee, Oklahoma
 K28JY-D in Carbondale, Colorado
 K28KC-D in Canon City, Colorado
 K28KI-D in Roseburg, Oregon
 K28KJ-D in Chelan, Washington
 K28KM-D in Clareton, Wyoming
 K28KN-D in Emery, Utah
 K28KO-D in Sweetgrass, etc., Montana
 K28KP-D in Clear Creek, Utah
 K28KQ-D in Ferron, Utah
 K28KR-D in Huntington, Utah
 K28KU-D in Crested Butte, Colorado
 K28KV-D in Turkey, Texas
 K28KW-D in Sunnyside, Washington
 K28LE-D in Idaho Falls, Idaho
 K28LG-D in Bridger, etc., Montana
 K28LH-D in Beowawe, Nevada
 K28LK-D in Silver City, New Mexico
 K28LL-D in Redwood Falls, Minnesota
 K28LM-D in Eureka, Nevada
 K28LO-D in Paisley, Oregon
 K28MH-D in Bend, Oregon
 K28MJ-D in Tillamook, Oregon
 K28MK-D in Phillips County, Montana
 K28MS-D in Bismarck, North Dakota
 K28NM-D in Carlsbad, New Mexico
 K28NN-D in Wailuku, Hawaii
 K28NO-D in Rogue River, Oregon
 K28NT-D in Bentonville & Rogers, Arkansas
 K28NU-D in Buffalo, Oklahoma
 K28NV-D in Ponca City, Oklahoma
 K28NX-D in Montoya & Newkirk, New Mexico
 K28NY-D in La Grande, Oregon
 K28NZ-D in Florence, Oregon
 K28OA-D in Cottonwood, Arizona
 K28OB-D in Plentywood, Montana
 K28OD-D in Powers, Oregon
 K28OE-D in Watertown, South Dakota
 K28OF-D in Memphis, Texas
 K28OG-D in Kalispell & Lakeside, Montana
 K28OH-D in St. James, Minnesota
 K28OI-D in Jackson, Minnesota
 K28OJ-D in Tropic & Cannonville, Utah
 K28OL-D in Loa, etc., Utah
 K28OM-D in Escalante, Utah
 K28ON-D in Castle Rock, etc., Montana
 K28OO-D in Fountain Green, Utah
 K28OP-D in Boulder, Utah
 K28OQ-D in Fishlake Resort, Utah
 K28OR-D in Caineville, Utah
 K28OS-D in Logan, Utah
 K28OT-D in Coalville, Utah
 K28OU-D in Henefer, etc., Utah
 K28OV-D in Madras, Oregon
 K28OW-D in Parowan/Enoch, etc., Utah
 K28OX-D in Weatherford, Oklahoma
 K28OY-D in Sierra Vista, Arizona
 K28PB-D in McDermitt, Nevada
 K28PD-D in Delta, Oak City, Utah
 K28PE-D in Kanarraville, etc., Utah
 K28PF-D in Vernal, etc., Utah
 K28PG-D in Price, Utah
 K28PH-D in Duchesne, Utah
 K28PI-D in Emery, Utah
 K28PJ-D in Elko, Nevada
 K28PK-D in Scofield, Utah
 K28PL-D in Roseau, Minnesota
 K28PN-D in Green River, Utah
 K28PO-D in Lake Havasu City, Arizona
 K28PP-D in Shurz, Nevada
 K28PQ-D in Saint Cloud, Minnesota
 K28PR-D in Castle Dale, Utah
 K28PS-D in Ruidoso, New Mexico
 K28PT-D in Manila, etc, Utah
 K28PU-D in Randolph, Utah
 K28PV-D in Clovis, New Mexico
 K28PX-D in Stead, Nevada
 K28PZ-D in Parlin, Colorado
 K28QA-D in Sapinero, Colorado
 K28QC-D in Imlay, Nevada
 K28QE-D in Caballo, New Mexico
 K28QF-D in Sherman, Texas
 K28QJ-D in Duluth, Minnesota
 K28QK-D in Pasco, Washington
 K28QQ-D in Williston, North Dakota
 K28QR-D in La Pine, Oregon
 K28QT-D in Dickinson, North Dakota
 K42KG-D in Fillmore, etc., Utah
 K44GH-D in Alexandria, Minnesota
 KBTC-TV (DRT) in Seattle, Washington
 KCJO-LD in Saint Joseph, Missouri
 KCMN-LD in Kansas City, Missouri
 KDBK-LD in Bakersfield, California
 KEAM-LD in Amarillo, Texas
 KGRY-LD in Gila River Indian Community, Arizona, an ATSC 3.0 station
 KIRO-TV (DRT) in Mt. Vernon, Washington
 KKPM-CD in Yuba City, California
 KLEG-CD in Dallas, Texas
 KMMD-CD in Salinas, California
 KNLD-LD in New Orleans, Louisiana
 KOPB-TV (DRT) in Sentinel Hill, Oregon
 KSAW-LD in Twin Falls, Idaho
 KSPK-LD in Walsenburg, Colorado
 KUGB-CD in Houston, Texas
 KVMM-CD in Santa Barbara, California
 KVPX-LD in Las Vegas, Nevada
 KWKD-LD in Wichita, Kansas
 KWYB-LD in Bozeman, Montana
 KYUU-LD in Boise, Idaho
 KZKC-LD in Bakersfield, California, uses KDBK's spectrum
 W28CJ-D in Manteo, North Carolina
 W28DA-D in Pittsfield, Massachusetts
 W28DQ-D in Windsor, Vermont
 W28DR-D in Cedarville, West Virginia
 W28DY-D in Sault Ste. Marie, Michigan
 W28EE-D in Canton, Etc., North Carolina
 W28EH-D in Adjuntas, Puerto Rico
 W28EQ-D in Utuado, Puerto Rico
 W28EU-D in Macon, Georgia
 W28EW-D in Toccoa, Georgia
 W28EX-D in Clarksburg, West Virginia
 W28FC-D in Roanoke, West Virginia
 W28FD-D in Greenville, Florida
 W28FG-D in Cleveland-Akron-Canton, Ohio
 WBQC-LD in Cincinnati, Ohio
 WBRE-TV in Waymart, Pennsylvania
 WBWM-LD in Mt Pleasant, Michigan
 WDWW-LD in Atlanta, Georgia
 WEDE-CD in Arlington Heights, Illinois
 WEPT-CD in Newburgh, New York
 WGDV-LD in Salisbury, Maryland
 WIFR-LD in Rockford, Illinois
 WJSJ-CD in Tipton, Indiana
 WKUW-LD in White House, Tennessee
 WLPC-LD in Redford, Michigan
 WMYS-LD in South Bend, Indiana
 WNYJ-LD in New York, New York
 WSST-LD in Albany, Georgia
 WTPM-LD in Mayaguez-Anasco, Puerto Rico
 WTVI (DRT) in Charlotte, North Carolina
 WUDX-LD in Tuscaloosa, Alabama
 WUOA-LD in Birmingham, Alabama
 WWBH-LD in Mobile, Alabama
 WWDG-CD in Rome, New York
 WWOO-LD in Westmoreland, New Hampshire
 WYAM-LD in Priceville, Alabama
 WYMI-LD in Summerland Key, Florida

The following low-power stations, which are no longer licensed, formerly broadcast on digital or analog channel 28:
 K28FM in Yuma, Arizona
 K28GW in Peoa, etc., Utah
 K28GZ in Orangeville, Utah
 K28HB in Alamogordo, New Mexico
 K28HM in Thoreau, New Mexico
 K28IP in Coalville and adjacent area, Utah
 K28LA-D in Yreka, California
 K28LC-D in Redding, California
 K28LN-D in Orr, Minnesota
 KCAB-LP in Casa Grande, Arizona
 KCOS-LP in Phoenix, Arizona
 KILW-LD in Rochester, Minnesota
 KJLR-LP in Little Rock, etc., Arkansas
 KLMC-LP in Jefferson City, Missouri
 KOXI-LD in Camas, Washington
 KQBN-LP in Prescott, Arizona
 W28CM in Manchester, New Hampshire
 WAZF-CD in Winchester/Front Royal, Virginia
 WNYF-LP in Watertown, New York
 WQVC-CD in Greensburg, Pennsylvania
 WRNG-LP in Chattanooga, Tennessee
 WVTX-CD in Bridgeport, Ohio

References

28 low-power